Al Khawr, also spelled Al Khor, may refer to:

Al Khor, a town located in northern Qatar
Al Khor Municipality, the municipality in which Al Khor town is located in
Al Khawr, Iran
Al Khawr, Yemen

See also 
 Khor (disambiguation)